American Faces is the ninth studio album by American country music artist John Conlee. It was released in 1987 via Columbia Records. The album includes the singles "Domestic Life", "Mama's Rockin' Chair" and "Living Like There's No Tomorrow".

Track listing

Personnel
Adapted from liner notes.

John Conlee - lead vocals, background vocals
Paul Franklin - steel guitar
Roger Hawkins - drums
David Hood - bass guitar
Jim Horn - horns
Steve Nathan - keyboards
Jack Peck - horns
Don Potter - guitar
Charlie Rose - horns
Brent Rowan - guitar
Harvey Thompson - horns
Cindy Walker - background vocals
Dennis Wilson - background vocals

Chart performance

References

1987 albums
John Conlee albums
Columbia Records albums